Lee Owens (born July 17, 1956) is a former American football coach. He served as the head football coach at the University of Akron from 1995 to 2003 and Ashland University in Ashland, Ohio from 2004 to 2022, compiled a career college football coaching record of 177–122. Between 1981 and 1991, he was the head football coach at four high schools in Ohio and then an assistant coach at Ohio State University from 1992 to 1994.  Owens directed the Galion Tigers to the D-II Ohio State Championship in 1985. He earned his Bachelor of Arts degree from Bluffton College in 1977.

Head coaching record

High school

College

References

External links
 Ashland profile

1956 births
Living people
Akron Zips football coaches
Ashland Eagles football coaches
Ohio State Buckeyes football coaches
High school football coaches in Ohio
Bluffton University alumni
People from Ashland County, Ohio